Türkay is a Turkish name & surname. Notable people with the surname include:

İnci Türkay (born 1972), Turkish actress
Osman Türkay (1927–2001), Turkish Cypriot poet
Tuvana Türkay (born 1990), Turkish actress

Turkish-language surnames